Pustiměř is a municipality and village in Vyškov District in the South Moravian Region of the Czech Republic. It has about 1,900 inhabitants.

Administrative parts
The village of Pustiměřské Prusy is an administrative part of Pustiměř.

Notable people
Karel Knesl (1942–2020), footballer

References

Villages in Vyškov District